State Route 172 (SR 172) is a  state highway that serves as an east-west connection between Vina and Bear Creek through Franklin and Marion Counties. SR 172 intersects SR 19 at its western terminus and SR 13 at its eastern terminus.

Route description
SR 172 begins at its intersection with SR 19 in Vina. From this point, SR 172 travels in a southeasterly direction where it meets SR 187 in Hodges. From Hodges, the route continues generally in its eastern direction and intersects US 43/SR 17 in Hackleburg. From this point, SR 172 again continues generally in an easterly direction and intersects SR 237, in addition to sharing a  concurrency with SR 241, prior to reaching its eastern terminus at SR 13 in Bear Creek.

Major intersections

References

172
Transportation in Franklin County, Alabama
Transportation in Marion County, Alabama